The women's discus throw at the 2016 European Athletics Championships took place at the Olympic stadium for the finals and at the Museumplein for qualifying on 6 and 8 July.

Records

Schedule

Results

Qualification

Qualification: 58.00 m (Q) or 12 best performers (q)

Final

References

External links
 amsterdam2016.org, official championship site

Discus Throw W
Discus throw at the European Athletics Championships
2016 in women's athletics